Simone Bolelli and Fabio Fognini were the defending champions, but they decided not to participate.
Marcel Granollers and Marc López won the title, defeating Pablo Cuevas and Horacio Zeballos in the final, 7–5, 6–4.

Seeds

Draw

Draw

External links
 Main Draw

Copa Claro - Doubles
2014 Doubles